Joiner is a surname. Notable people with the surname include:

Alvin Joiner (born 1974), American rapper known as Xzibit
Charles Wycliffe Joiner (1916-2017), American judge
Charlie Joiner (born 1947), American Football player Hall of Famer, and coach
Michael Joiner (born 1981), American Basketball player
Rusty Joiner (born 1972), American Model
Thomas Joiner (born 1965), American psychologist

Meaning
 English: occupational name for a maker of wooden furniture, Anglo-Norman French joignour (Old French joigneor, from joinre ‘to join’, ‘to connect’, Latin iungere).

See also
Joyner (disambiguation)